Mark Bowden (born 1979, Wales) is a British composer of classical music.

Biography
Bowden studied composition with Richard Steinitz at the University of Huddersfield before completing a master's degree at the Royal College of Music where he studied with Julian Anderson. He has received commissions from the London Sinfonietta, the BBC Symphony Orchestra,  the BBC National Orchestra of Wales, the Ulster Orchestra, and Welsh National Opera amongst others and his music has been broadcast by BBC Radio 3. With Anna Meredith and Emily Hall he created the Camberwell Composers' Collective.

Bowden has received awards and prizes for his music including the Royal Philharmonic Society Composition Prize,  a British Composer Award,  and an Ivor Novello Awards nomination for his saxophone concerto Sapiens.

Bowden was the first composer-in-residence at Handel House Museum  and, with fellow composers in the Camberwell Composers' Collective, was New Music Associate at Kettle's Yard in Cambridge from 2008-2010. He was the 2011–2012 Music Fellow at Rambert Dance Company.

Bowden was Resident Composer at BBC National Orchestra of Wales from 2011 to 2015 and Director of Composition at Royal Holloway, University of London from 2007-2022. In 2017 the University of London awarded Bowden the title of Professor of Composition  and in 2022 he was appointed Professor of Music at the Royal College of Music.

Selected works
Voices on the Air (2021) for chamber ensemble

Outside (2020) for orchestra

Sapiens (2018) for solo saxophone & ensemble

Three Interludes (2018) for orchestra

Five Memos (2015) for violin & piano

We Have Found a Better Land (2015) for chorus

Airs No Oceans Keep (2015) for piano trio

A Violence of Gifts (2014) for soprano, baritone, chorus & orchestra

Channel Rose (2014) for soprano saxophone & vibraphone

Beldam (2014) for solo percussion

Heartland (2012) for solo percussion & orchestra

Parable (2012) for solo saxophone

Lyra (2011) for solo cello & orchestra

Lines Written a Few Miles Below (2011) for solo violin & track

The Soul Candle (2008) for baritone and piano

Sudden Light (2004) for orchestra

Recordings

Taliesin’s Songbook
 Label: Tŷ Cerdd
 Performers: Gareth Brynmor John and Andrew Matthews-Owen
 Work: The Soul Candle

Flux
 Label: NMC
 Performers: Fidelio Trio
 Work: Airs No Oceans Keep

Sudden Light
 Label: NMC
 Performers: Oliver Coates (cello), Julian Warburton (percussion), Hyeyoon Park (violin), Huw Watkins (piano), BBC National Orchestra of Wales, Grant Llewellyn (conductor)
 Works: Lyra, Heartland, Five Memos, Sudden Light

Bach to Parker
 Label: Champs Hill Records
 Performer: Thomas Gould
 Work: Lines Written a Few Miles Below

Parable
 Label: NMC
 Performer: Simon Haram
 Work: Parable

References

External links
 Official website
 Mark Bowdens works at Composers Edition
 
 Camberwell Composers Collective website

1979 births
Living people
Welsh classical composers
Welsh male classical composers
21st-century classical composers
Alumni of the University of Huddersfield
Alumni of the Royal College of Music
People from Abertillery
21st-century British male musicians